Miyapadavu is a small village of Meenja Panchayath of  Manjeshwar taluk Kasaragod district, Kerala state, India.

Location
Miyapadavu is located east of Hosangadi junction in Majeshwar. It is 7.5 kilometers away from Hosangadi junction.

Transportation
Miyapadavu can be accessed by bus from Uppala, Hosangadi/Manjeshwar towns.

Image gallery

References

Villages in Kasaragod district